The 2020 F4 Danish Championship season was the fourth season of the F4 Danish Championship. The season began at Jyllandsringen in June and concluded at Ring Djursland in September.

Teams and drivers

Calendar 
The season was initially intended to start Padborg Park on 9 May, but the opening two rounds of the season were ultimately cancelled due to the COVID-19 pandemic. The penultimate round at Padborg Park was cancelled as the authorities withdrew their permission for the event. The final round at Jyllandsringen was removed from the schedule of the race weekend as the organizers had to limit the number of participants due to the COVID-19 pandemic. The finale was rescheduled to take place on 31 October at Sturup Raceway in Sweden but was cancelled following updated travel advice from Denmark's government.

Race results

Championship standings 

Points are awarded to the top 10 classified finishers in each race. No points are awarded for pole position or fastest lap.

Drivers' standings 

 † – Driver did not finish the race, but was classified as they completed over 75% of the race distance.

Teams' championship

Notes

References

External links 

 

F4 Danish Championship

Danish F4 Championship
Danish F4 Championship
F4 Danish Championship seasons